Menorca Bàsquet, S.A.D. was a professional basketball team based in Menorca, Balearic Islands.

On July 5, 2012 the club announced its dissolution after it was forced to renounce to its third promotion to Liga ACB, putting an end to 62 years of history.

Sponsors
 2000–2004: Coinga, the club was renamed Coinga Menorca Básquet
 2004–2005: IBB Hoteles, the club was renamed IBB Hoteles Menorca Básquet
 2005–2006: Llanera, the club was renamed Llanera Menorca
 2006–2010: ViveMenorca, the club was renamed ViveMenorca

Team logos

Players

Season by season

Supporter Groups
 A por ellos
 Penya Forera Jaleo

References

External links
Menorca Bàsquet Official Website

 
Defunct basketball teams in Spain
Former LEB Oro teams
Former Liga ACB teams
Basketball teams established in 1950
Basketball teams disestablished in 2012
Former Liga EBA teams
Basketball teams in the Balearic Islands
Sport in Menorca